{{Infobox tennis biography
|name                        = Félix Auger-Aliassime
|image                       = Auger Aliassime RG21 (91) (51377187345).jpg
|caption                     = Auger-Aliassime at the 2021 French Open
|country                     = 
|residence                   = Monte Carlo, Monaco
|birth_date                  = 
|birth_place                 = Montreal, Quebec, Canada
|height                      = 1.93 m
|turnedpro                   = 2017
|plays                       = Right-handed (two-handed backhand)
|coach                       = Guillaume MarxFrédéric Fontang Toni Nadal
|careerprizemoney            = US$10,445,865
|singlesrecord               = {{tennis record|won=171|lost=109|details=  in ATP Tour and Grand Slam main draw matches, and in Davis Cup|small=yes}} 
|singlestitles               = 4
|highestsinglesranking       = No. 6 (November 7, 2022)
|currentsinglesranking       = No. 6
(March 20, 2023)
|AustralianOpenresult        = QF (2022)
|FrenchOpenresult            = 4R (2022)
|Wimbledonresult             = QF (2021)
|USOpenresult                = SF (2021)
|Othertournaments            = yes
|MastersCupresult            = RR (2022)
|Olympicsresult              = 1R (2020)
|doublesrecord               = 

Félix Auger-Aliassime (born August 8, 2000) is a Canadian professional tennis player. He is the third-youngest player ranked in the top 10 by the Association of Tennis Professionals (ATP), and has a career-high singles ranking of No. 6, which he achieved on 7 November 2022, making him the second-highest-ranked Canadian man in ATP rankings history, and the fourth-highest-ranked Canadian player in history. He has a doubles ranking of No. 60, attained on 1 November 2021. He has won four singles titles and one doubles title on the ATP Tour and was also selected as the 2022 Canadian Press athlete of the year.

Auger-Aliassime began competing on the professional tour at a young age. On the second-tier ATP Challenger Tour, he is the youngest player to win a main draw match at 14 years and 11 months old, and is one of seven players to win a Challenger title by the age of 16. He is the second-youngest to win multiple Challenger titles at 17 years and one month, and the youngest player to defend a Challenger title at 17 years and ten months. Auger-Aliassime had a successful junior career, reaching No. 2 in the world and winning the 2016 US Open boys' singles title. He also won the previous year's boys' doubles title at the 2015 US Open with compatriot Denis Shapovalov. On the ATP Tour, Auger-Aliassime made his top 100 and top 25 debuts at age 18 in a year highlighted by his first ATP final in February 2019 at the Rio Open, an ATP 500 event. He reached three ATP finals in 2019, another three in 2020, and two finals in 2021, a total of eight consecutive runners-up out of eight ATP finals as well as the semifinals at the 2021 US Open. He is the only player other than  Novak Djokovic and John Isner to force Rafael Nadal into a five-set encounter at the French Open.

Early life
Auger-Aliassime was born in Montreal and raised in L'Ancienne-Lorette, a suburb of Quebec City. His father Sam Aliassime is of African descent and emigrated from Togo, and his mother Marie Auger is of French-Canadian descent. His father was a tennis instructor. He has an older sister Malika who also plays tennis. He started playing tennis at 4 and trained at the Club Avantage as a member of the Académie de Tennis Hérisset-Bordeleau in Quebec City. In 2012, he won the Open Super Auray in the age 11 to 12 category. He has been a member of Tennis Canada's National Training Centre in Montreal since the fall of 2014.

Tennis career

Juniors

In February 2015, Auger-Aliassime won his first ITF junior singles title at the G3 in Querétaro. A week later, he won his second straight ITF junior singles title and first doubles title at the G4 in Zapopan. In late August 2015, he won his first junior G1 title with a victory over compatriot Denis Shapovalov in College Park. At the US Open in September 2015, his first junior Grand Slam, he reached the second round in singles and won the doubles title with Shapovalov. In October 2015, Auger-Aliassime and compatriots Denis Shapovalov and Benjamin Sigouin won the Junior Davis Cup title, the first time in history for Canada. In December 2015 at the Eddie Herr International Tennis Championship, he won his second G1 singles title after defeating Alex De Minaur in the final. At the junior event of the French Open in June 2016, he reached his first Grand Slam singles final where he was defeated by Geoffrey Blancaneaux in three sets, despite holding a championship point. In July 2016 at Wimbledon, Auger-Aliassime advanced to the quarterfinals in singles and to the final in doubles with Denis Shapovalov. At the US Open in September 2016, he won the boys' singles title with a straight-sets victory over Miomir Kecmanović. He reached the doubles final as well, with fellow Canadian Benjamin Sigouin.

As a junior, he compiled a singles win–loss record of 79–19.

Junior Grand Slam results – Singles:

Australian Open: 3R (2016)
French Open: F (2016)
Wimbledon: QF (2016)
US Open: W (2016)

Junior Grand Slam results – Doubles:

Australian Open: 1R (2016)
French Open: 2R (2016)
Wimbledon: F (2016)
US Open: W (2015)

2015–16
In March 2015 at the Challenger Banque Nationale de Drummondville, Auger-Aliassime became the youngest player in history to qualify for an ATP Challenger main draw at 14-and-a-half years old. He defeated compatriot Jack Mingjie Lin, former world No. 67 Chris Guccione and world No. 433 Fritz Wolmarans to do so. He, however, was forced to withdraw before playing his first-round match due to an abdominal strain. With the points earned, Auger-Aliassime once again made history as the first player born in the 2000s to have an ATP ranking. At the Challenger Banque Nationale de Granby in July 2015, he qualified for his second ATP Challenger main draw with victories over fellow Canadian Jack Mingjie Lin and world No. 574 Jean-Yves Aubone. He won his opening round in straight sets over world No. 493 Andrew Whittington, becoming the youngest player to win a main-draw ATP Challenger match. In the next round, he scored an upset over world No. 205 Darian King in straight sets. He was stopped by world No. 145 Yoshihito Nishioka in three sets in the quarterfinals. After his run to the quarterfinals, Auger-Aliassime became the youngest player ever to break the top 800 on the ATP rankings at No. 749.

In May 2016, he reached his first professional singles final at the $10K in Lleida, falling to Ramkumar Ramanathan. In November 2016, he won his first professional title with a victory over Juan Manuel Benitez Chavarriaga at the ITF Futures in Birmingham. The next week at the Futures in Niceville, he captured his first pro doubles title with partner Patrick Kypson.

2017: Turning pro, first Challenger titles & top 200
In January, Auger-Aliassime reached the final of the ITF Futures in Plantation, but lost to Roberto Cid Subervi in three sets. In March, he won the title in Sherbrooke over Gleb Sakharov, his second ITF Futures. The next week, he advanced to the semifinals of the ATP Challenger $75K in Drummondville with a win over world No. 124 Peter Polansky, but lost to compatriot and eventual champion Denis Shapovalov. In June at the Open de Lyon, Auger-Aliassime captured his maiden ATP Challenger, becoming the first 16-year-old to win a Challenger singles title since Bernard Tomic in 2009 at the Maccabi Men's Challenger and the seventh-youngest in history. In September at the Copa Sevilla, he won his second ATP Challenger title of the season after defeating former world No. 56, Íñigo Cervantes, in the final. After his win, he became the youngest player to break the top 200 since Rafael Nadal in December 2002 and the second-youngest to win multiple ATP Challenger titles, standing behind only Richard Gasquet.

2018: Continued Challengers' success & improvement
In February in Budapest, Auger-Aliassimbe captured his first ATP Challenger doubles title, defeating Marin Draganja and Tomislav Draganja with a partner Nicola Kuhn. Auger-Aliassime also made his debut in an ATP main draw at the Rotterdam Open, losing in three sets to world No. 38, Filip Krajinović, in the first round. In March at Indian Wells, he qualified for his first ATP Masters 1000 main draw. He faced fellow Canadian Vasek Pospisil in the first round, defeating him in straight sets to win his first tour-level match. He was defeated in the next round by another compatriot, Milos Raonic. In April, Auger-Aliassime was awarded a wildcard for the Monte-Carlo Masters where he lost his opener in three sets to world No. 55, Mischa Zverev. In June at the ATP Challenger in Lyon, he successfully defended his title with a victory over Johan Tatlot in the final and became the youngest player in history to defend an ATP Challenger title.  In August, Auger-Aliassime received a wildcard to compete in the main draw of the 2018 Rogers Cup. In the first round, he defeated Lucas Pouille (6–4, 6–3) and in the second round, he was defeated by Daniil Medvedev (3–6, 6–4, 7–6). Auger-Aliassime earned a spot through three qualifying matches to reach the main draw of the US Open. He then retired in the first round (5–7, 7–5, 4–1 ret.) against countryman Denis Shapovalov after suffering from heart palpitations brought on by extreme heat.

2019: Masters semifinal, Three ATP finals, Davis Cup final
At age 18, Auger-Aliassime became the youngest-ever ATP 500 finalist with his win over Pablo Cuevas (6–3, 3–6, 6–3) to reach the Rio Open title match. In the final, he lost to Laslo Đere in straight sets. At his next tournament in São Paulo, Auger-Aliassime lost to Đere again - this time in the quarterfinals. At the Indian Wells Masters, he achieved his first victory against a top-ten player, defeating Stefanos Tsitsipas (who was No. 10 in the ATP rankings at that time) in straight sets in the second round. 

At the Miami Open, Auger-Aliassime beat Nikoloz Basilashvili in the fourth round and Borna Ćorić in the quarterfinals to become the youngest semifinalist in the tournament's history. In the semifinals, he lost to defending champion and eventual runner-up John Isner in two tight sets, despite leading by a break in both sets.

He received a wildcard to play in the Madrid Open. Auger-Aliassime made it to the second round where he was defeated by Rafael Nadal in straight sets. At the Lyon Open, he worked his way into his second ATP final, by beating John Millman, Steve Johnson, and Nikoloz Basilashvili, the No. 1 seed. He was then defeated by Benoît Paire in straight sets.

In the Mercedes Cup he made it to his third final, by defeating experienced players like Ernests Gulbis, Gilles Simon, and Dustin Brown. He received a walkover into the final when Milos Raonic withdrew. In the final he was defeated by Matteo Berrettini, despite having set points to win the second set.

At Queen's Club, Auger-Aliassime defeated Grigor Dimitrov and Nick Kyrgios, both matches were played on the same day as the tournament program was delayed by rain earlier during the week. In the quarterfinals, he recorded his second win against Stefanos Tsitsipas. Auger-Aliassime lost in the semifinals to eventual champion Feliciano López.

At Wimbledon he entered as the 19th seed and earned his first victory as a pro in the Slams, by defeating compatriot Vasek Pospisil. After beating Corentin Moutet in four sets, he was stopped by Ugo Humbert in the third round.

At the US Open he lost to in the first round to Denis Shapovalov for the second straight year.

2020: Three more ATP singles finals, first doubles title
At the 2020 Australian Open, Auger-Aliassime lost in the first round to Ernests Gulbis.

Auger-Aliassime was seeded 15th at the 2020 US Open and advanced to the fourth round after defeating Thiago Monteiro, Andy Murray, and Corentin Moutet in the first three rounds. He then lost in straight sets to the second seed and eventual champion Dominic Thiem.

Auger-Aliassime then participated in the rescheduled French Open, where he fell to Yoshihito Nishioka in the first round.

In October, he reached the final of the Bett1Hulks Indoors tournament in Cologne, Germany, losing to home favorite, Alexander Zverev. Auger-Aliassime claimed the doubles title at the Paris Masters with partner Hubert Hurkacz, saving five championship points in his first doubles final.

2021: US Open semifinal, two singles & one doubles finals, Olympics & top 10
At the 2021 Australian Open, Auger-Aliassime lost in the fourth round to Russian qualifier Aslan Karatsev, despite being 2 sets to love up.

In April, he hired Rafael Nadal's uncle and former coach Toni Nadal as a new coach ahead of the clay-court season.

At the French Open, Auger-Aliassime lost in the first round to Andreas Seppi. 
He also lost his eighth final at the 2021 Stuttgart Open final to Marin Čilić.

At the Halle Open he reached the semifinals by defeating 10-time tournament champion and 5th seed, Roger Federer in the second round to secure his fourth Top-10 victory (4-15). However, Federer’s right knee, for which he underwent 2 surgeries in 2020, started hurting again in Halle 2021, as confirmed by Federer’s coach, Ivan Ljubicic, which hampered Federer’s performance a lot against Auger-Aliassime, and Federer went on to lose that match. The injury was serious as Federer would undergo surgery on that knee yet again after the grass-court season in 2021. Felix then defeated qualifier Marcos Giron in the quarterfinals but lost to the eventual champion Ugo Humbert. In the same tournament in doubles he reached the final partnering Hubert Hurkacz but lost to 3rd seeded German Kevin Krawietz and Romanian Horia Tecău.

At Wimbledon, he reached his first Grand Slam quarterfinal with a five-set win over world No. 6 and 4th seed Alexander Zverev, beating the German 6–4, 7–6, 3–6, 3–6, 6–4 for only the fifth Top-10 win of his career. He became the fifth Canadian man to reach the Wimbledon quarterfinals after 10th seed Denis Shapovalov did so in the same tournament. It marked the first time that two Canadian men together reached a Grand Slam quarterfinal. With this successful run he entered the top 15 in the rankings. He then lost to 7th seed and eventual finalist Matteo Berrettini 3–6, 7–5, 5–7, 3–6 in the quarterfinals.

At the rescheduled 2020 Tokyo Olympics, Auger-Aliassime was set to play defending gold medalist Andy Murray in the first round. However, Murray withdrew from singles due to a calf injury, and Auger-Aliassime was upset by his replacement, 190th ranked Australian Max Purcell.

At the 2021 Citi Open, seeded 2nd, Auger-Aliassime was upset by 130th ranked American wild card Jenson Brooksby in the third round.

At the 2021 National Bank Open, seeded 9th, Auger-Aliassime was upset by Dušan Lajović in the second round.

At the US Open, Auger-Aliassime reached his maiden Major semifinals following wins over 18th-seed Roberto Bautista Agut, Frances Tiafoe, and Carlos Alcaraz (the latter via a retirement). There, he lost to world No. 2 Daniil Medvedev in straight sets. He became the youngest player to play in the semifinals since 2009. Following his run at the US Open, Felix reached a career-high ATP World No. 11 ranking on 13 September 2021. He reached the semifinals at the 2021 Stockholm Open where he lost to defending champion fellow Canadian Denis Shapovalov. As a result he entered the top 10 on 15 November 2021.

2022: ATP & Davis & Laver Cups winner, 4 titles, Major quarters, 150th career win

Auger-Aliassime started his 2022 season at the ATP Cup, in which he was part of the winning team. He played for Canada along with teammate Denis Shapovalov where they defeated Roberto Bautista Agut and Pablo Carreno Busta, who played for Spain, in the final. As a result, he hit a new career-high of World No. 9 on January 10, 2022.

Auger-Aliassime subsequently entered the Australian Open seeded ninth, where he beat Emil Ruusuvuori in the first round in five sets, despite receiving a bagel in the second set. He beat Alejandro Davidovich Fokina in the second round, and defeated 24th seed Dan Evans in the third. He defeated 27th seed Marin Čilić in the fourth round, before losing to number two seed Daniil Medvedev in five sets in the quarterfinals.

Auger-Aliassime entered the 2022 Rotterdam Open seeded third. After wins against Egor Gerasimov, Andy Murray, Cameron Norrie, and Andrey Rublev, Auger-Aliassime faced top seed Stefanos Tsitsipas in the final. He beat Tsitsipas in straight sets, winning his first ATP Tour title after a record of 0–8 in previous finals. Auger-Aliassime entered the 2022 Open 13 Provence and again reached the finals after straight set wins against Jo-Wilfried Tsonga, Ilya Ivashka, and Roman Safiullin, but lost to Andrey Rublev in straight sets.
Auger-Aliassime withdrew from the 2022 Dubai Tennis Championships with a back injury. He was to be seeded third. He entered the 2022 Indian Wells Masters seeded ninth, and lost to Botic van de Zandschulp in the second round.

At the French Open, Auger-Aliassime won his first match at this tournament and came back from two sets to love down for the first time in his career to beat Juan Pablo Varillas in the first round. He then beat another qualifier, Camilo Ugo Carabelli, and Filip Krajinovic in straight sets to set up a fourth round encounter with Rafael Nadal. There he became only the third player after Novak Djokovic and John Isner to take Nadal to five sets at this tournament.

At the 2022 National Bank Open, Auger-Aliassime lost in the quarterfinals to Casper Ruud after defeating Cameron Norrie in the third round. At the Cincinnati Masters, Auger-Aliassime reached his fourth back-to-back quarterfinal at a Masters 1000 level in the season defeating Jannik Sinner after saving two match points. Next he was upset by eventual winner Borna Coric.
At the US Open, Auger-Aliassime lost in the second round to Jack Draper in straight sets. Auger-Aliassime made 41 unforced errors compared to just 17 by Draper.

At the 2022 Davis Cup group stage, Auger-Aliassime upset US Open champion and world no. 1 Carlos Alcaraz.

At the Firenze Open, he won his second title with a win over JJ Wolf in the final. He won his second consecutive title and third overall title in Antwerp, defeating Sebastian Korda in the final. 
He reached a third consecutive final in Basel, recording his second victory of the year over world No. 1 Alcaraz in the semifinals in the process. He defeated Holger Rune in the final in straight sets, winning his third consecutive title, and fourth overall. He became the third player in the season to win an ATP Tour title without dropping a service game, the other two being Taylor Fritz and Nick Kyrgios. In the process he recorded his 50th win of the year and 150th of his career against Miomir Kecmanovic in the second round. At the Paris Masters, he reached the semifinals, recording his first match victory against qualifier Mikael Ymer, in a three tight set match with two tiebreaks that lasted 3 hours and 30 minutes. He defeated retiring Gilles Simon for his 15th win to reach his fifth back-to-back Masters 1000 quarterfinal. The previous day on November 2, he also qualified for his first ATP Finals. In the quarterfinals, Auger Aliassime defeated Frances Tiafoe and thus recording his 16th straight win and the second longest streak for the season behind Nadal’s 20 wins. As a result of this run he guaranteed himself the world No. 6 spot in the rankings on November 7, 2022. He lost to Holger Rune in the semifinals, ending his 16-match winning streak in a repeat of the Swiss Open title match. At the 2022 ATP Finals, Auger-Aliassime lost to Taylor Fritz in three sets after defeating Rafael Nadal in an earlier group stage match.

In the knock-out stage of the 2022 Davis Cup, Auger-Aliassime teamed up with Denis Shapovalov and Vasek Pospisil for Canada's first Davis Cup Finals win. Canada defeated Australia in the finals after defeating Germany and Italy.

Playing style
Auger-Aliassime is an all-court tennis player. His favorite surface is clay. His favorite shot is the forehand, and his favorite tournament is the Rogers Cup, because it is played in his hometown of Montreal. Auger Aliassime also possesses a strong serve and moves well around the court. He is able to generate power easily off both wings, but is sometimes prone to unforced errors. Additionally, Felix plays with high intensity at each point, which can wear down his opponents during long matches.

Career statistics

Grand Slam tournament singles performance timeline

Current through the 2023 Australian Open.

ATP Masters 1000 finals

Doubles: 1 (1 title)

Records

References

External links

 
 
 
 

2000 births
Living people
Black Canadian sportspeople
Canadian male tennis players
Canadian people of Togolese descent
Grand Slam (tennis) champions in boys' singles
French Quebecers
Grand Slam (tennis) champions in boys' doubles
People from Capitale-Nationale
Tennis players from Montreal
US Open (tennis) junior champions
Tennis players at the 2020 Summer Olympics
Olympic tennis players of Canada